Ward Randal Scarff (born 17 February 1957) is an Australian former cricketer.

Scarff was born at Perth in February 1957. Having represented Western Australia at colt level, he later played club cricket in Scotland for Greenock. Strong performances for Greenock led to his selection for Scotland in the 1981 Benson & Hedges Cup, with Scarff making four appearances against Lancashire, Derbyshire, Yorkshire, and Warwickshire. Playing as an opening batsman in the Scottish side, he scored 63 runs in his four matches at an average of 15.75, with a highest score of 28. With his slow left-arm orthodox bowling, he took 2 wickets.

References

External links
 

1957 births
Living people
Cricketers from Perth, Western Australia
Australian cricketers
Scotland cricketers